"Family" is a song by American electronic duo The Chainsmokers and Norwegian DJ and producer Kygo. It was released on December 6, 2019 as the eighth single from the duo's third studio album, World War Joy.

Background 
On November 26, 2019, during their World War Joy tour, the duo announced that their album was set to be released on December 6. Then, its entire track listing was made available on their store, unveiling this collaboration with the Norwegian DJ. The collaboration between the artists was never teased before this date. Three days later, DJ Mag announced that it would be released as a single. On December 3, The Chainsmokers posted the cover of the song on their social media.

Music video 
The music video of "Family" is primarily a montage of amateur videos focusing on The Chainsmokers' videographer Rory Kramer, detailing his career, a car accident he got in, and how his family helped him recover.

Charts

Weekly charts

Year-end charts

References

Songs about families
2019 singles
2019 songs
The Chainsmokers songs
Kygo songs
Columbia Records singles
Disruptor Records singles
Electronic dance music songs
Song recordings produced by Kygo
Song recordings produced by the Chainsmokers
Songs written by Andrew Taggart
Songs written by Kygo